The Jezava is a river in central Serbia. Formerly a distributary of the Great Morava that flowed into the Danube in Smederevo at the Smederevo Fortress, its upper course was separated from the Great Morava by a dam after floods in 1897. In the 1970s the lower course of the Jezava was diverted into a new stream bed, leading to the Great Morava. The old bed of the Jezava in Smederovo has been retained for drainage of the urban area of Smederovo. The Jezava drains an area of 692 km², belonging to the Black Sea drainage basin.

Tributaries 
 Ralja (Serbian Cyrillic: Раља)
 Konjska River ( / Konjska reka, "Horse River")

See also 
 Rivers in Serbia

References 

Rivers of Serbia